Erigeron petiolaris is a species of flowering plant in the family Asteraceae. It is native to northern and central Asia (Siberia, Xinjiang, Kazakhstan, Uzbekistan).

Erigeron petiolaris a perennial herb up to 28 cm tall, with a short rhizome. It produces flower heads one at a time or in groups of 2 or 3, each head containing pink or white ray florets and yellow disc florets. The species grows in arctic or alpine regions on rocky slopes.

References

petiolaris
Flora of Asia
Plants described in 1906